The Cabinet of the state of Andhra Pradesh, India, forms the executives branch of the Government of Andhra Pradesh.

This is a list of Council of ministers from N. T. Rama Rao's third cabinet of Andhra Pradesh starting from December 1994 till September 1995. N. T. Rama Rao was the Telugu film actor-turned-politician form Telugu Desam Party who was sworn in the Chief Minister of N. T. Rama Rao in December 1994.

His third and last term as Chief Minister only lasted nine months following a coup led by his son-in-law Nara Chandrababu Naidu in which he was ousted.

Council of Ministers

First N. T. Rama Rao ministry (1983 to 1985)

References

Telugu Desam Party
1994 establishments in Andhra Pradesh
1994 in Indian politics
Andhra Pradesh ministries

1995 disestablishments in India
Cabinets established in 1994
Cabinets disestablished in 1995